Anant Nag is an Indian actor and occasional film producer who appears as an actor in predominantly in Kannada films and a few Hindi and Telugu films. In a career spanning over 5 decades, he has appeared in over 270 films. After having had a successful theatre career, he made his debut in P. V. Nanjaraja Urs' Kannada film Sankalpa, and Shyam Benegal's Dakhani film Ankur, with the former seeing theatrical release first, in 1973, and won multiple awards at the 1972–73 Karnataka State Film Awards. In G. V. Iyer's 1975 film Hamsageethe, he played the role of Bhairavi Venkatasubbiah, a performance that won critical praise, and the film was awarded the Best Feature Film in Kannada at the 23rd National Film Awards.

Nag went on to appear as a parallel lead alongside leading actors during the time such as Ambareesh and Rajinikanth in the second half of the 1970s. The year 1980 saw the first collaboration of his with his brother Shankar Nag, who appeared as a parallel lead and the director of Minchina Ota. The former's performance won him his first Karnataka State Film Award for Best Actor. They further worked together in the latter's directorial films Janma Janmada Anubandha (1980), Nodi Swamy Navirodu Hige (1985) and Accident (1985). The brothers worked together for the last time in Shankar's 1987 directorial hugely popular television series Malgudi Days, based on a collection of short stories of the same name by R. K. Narayan, in 1987 that aired on Doordarshan. Nag also became known for his collaboration with Benegal following Ankur in films such as Nishant (1975), Manthan (1976), Kondura (1978) and Kalyug (1981). The lead pair of Nag and actress Lakshmi became widely popular in the 1970s and 1980s after they appeared in popular films such as Chandanada Gombe (1979), Naa Ninna Bidalaare (1979) and Makkaliralavva Mane Thumba (1984) among many others. His performances in Hosa Neeru (1986), Avasthe (1987) and Gangavva Gangamayi (1994) won him three more Best Actor awards at the Karnataka State Film Awards. The decade of 1990s saw him appearing in comic roles and established this image of his with films such as Ganeshana Maduve (1990), Golmaal Radhakrishna (1990), Gauri Ganesha (1991). His second stint in television came in the 2002 Kannada soap opera Garva. He went on to appear in Preeti Illada Mele (2006), Chitte Hejje (2013), Nithyotsava (2013) and Lottery (2013).

In the second half of 1990s, Nag began appearing predominantly in supporting roles and this continued till K.G.F: Chapter 1 (2018). The period saw him win multiple nominations and awards at various film awards including the Filmfare Awards South. In recognition of his contribution towards Kannada cinema, the Government of Karnataka honoured with the Dr. Vishnuvardhan Award in 2013.

Film

Kannada films

Other language films

Television

References

External links 
 

Indian filmographies
Male actor filmographies